Huang Xiangdong ( born 22 March 1958 in Dalian) is a Chinese football coach and a former international player. In his football career he represented the Kunming Army Unit, Bayi Football Team and Locomotive while internationally he played for China in the 1980 Asian Cup and 1982 FIFA World Cup qualification campaign. Since retiring he has moved into coaching with his last appointment being with Chinese league two club Wenzhou Provenza in their 2010 league campaign.

Career statistics

International statistics

Honours

Player

Bayi Football Team
Chinese Jia-A League: 1986

References

External links
Team China Stats
Player profile at Sodasoccer

1958 births
Living people
Chinese football managers
Chinese footballers
Footballers from Dalian
China international footballers
1980 AFC Asian Cup players
Bayi Football Team players
Footballers at the 1982 Asian Games
Association football forwards
Asian Games competitors for China
Hunan Billows F.C. managers